Jovan Stojoski (Јован Стојоски) (born 26 November 1997 in Belgrade) is a Serbian sprinter that represents  Macedonia since 2019.

Biography
Stojoski is a national record holder on 6 discipline: 200m outdoor, 200m indoor, 400m indoor, 400m U23 outdoor, 400m U23 indoor and 300m outdoor. He won two events, 100 m and 200 m, at the 2019 European Team Championships, in Skopje.

He reached the final at the 2019 European Athletics U23 Championships – Men's 400 metres in Gävle, Sweden (6th place). 
He represented his country at the 2019 World Athletics Championships in Doha. He was a member of AK Crvena zvezda between 2011-2018. Since 2018. he is a member of AK Ohrid.

In 2021, he is selected by World Athletics to represent North Macedonia to 2020 Summer Olympics, by Universality place on Men's 400 metres event.

Personal Records
Outdoor:
 100 m - 10,59 (-0,9 m/s)  Bar | May 1, 2022
 200 m - 21,32 NR (+0,1 m/s) Sarajevo | Jun 30, 2019
 300 m - 33,83 NR Skopje | Oct 3, 2020
 400 m - 46,81  Tokyo | Aug 1, 2021
Indoor:
 60m - 6,97 Belgrade | Jan 23, 2022
 200m - 21,56 NR Belgrade | Dec 26, 2021
 400m - 47,18 NR Budapest | Feb 20, 2022

Career Highlights 
2016

Balkan U20 Championship - Bolu/Turkey 400m (6th place)

Balkan U20 Championship - Bolu/Turkey 4x400m (Bronze medal)

2018

European Champion Clubs Cup - Tampere/Finland 4x400 DQ

2019

World Athletics Championship - Doha/Qatar - 400m (38th place)

European U23 Championship - Gävle/Sweden 400m (6th place)

European Team Championship 3rd League - Skopje/Macedonia 100m (Gold medal)

European Team Championship 3rd League - Skopje/Macedonia 200m (Gold medal)

European Team Championship 3rd League - Skopje/Macedonia 400m (Bronze medal)

Balkan Senior Championship - Pravets/Bulgaria 400m (4th place)

2021

The XXXII Olympic Games Tokyo 2020 - 400m (38th place)

European Indoor Championship - Torun/Poland - 400m (48th place)

Championship of the Small States of Europe - Serrvalle/San Marino - 100m (Bronze medal)

Championship of the Small States of Europe - Serrvalle/San Marino - 400m (Bronze medal)

European Team Championship 3rd League - Limassol/Cyprus 100m (4th place)

European Team Championship 3rd League - Limassol/Cyprus 200m (Bronze medal)

European Team Championship 3rd League - Limassol/Cyprus 400m (Silver medal)

2022

World Athletics Indoor Championship - Belgrade/Serbia - 400m (21st place)

XIX Mediterranean Games - Oran/Algeria - 400m (12th place)

Championship of the Small States of Europe - Marsa/Malta - 400m (Bronze medal)

Championship of the Small States of Europe - Marsa/Malta - 100m (5th place)

References

External links

 https://www.european-athletics.org/athletes/group=s/athlete=231117-stojoski-jovan/index.html

1997 births
Macedonian male sprinters
Living people
Athletes (track and field) at the 2020 Summer Olympics
Olympic athletes of North Macedonia